Paolo Romano Carta (born 18 April 1964, Rome) is an Italian musician, singer, guitarist, musical director and record producer.

Biography
Carta was born in Rome in 1964, he married Roberta Galli, with whom he had three children Jader (1995), Jacopo (1996) and Joseph (2000). Until in 2005 Carta began working as a guitarist for Laura Pausini, leading to a harsh separation with Roberta that was partly influenced by the love affair that arose between Paolo and Laura when he was still married, making the divorce official in 2012. Since 2005 he has been the guitarist, musical director and sentimental partner of the Italian Laura with whom he has a daughter named Paola (2013).

Career 
He has collaborated with several greats of Italian song, including Adriano Celentano, Eros Ramazzotti, Alexia, Fabio Concato, Riccardo Cocciante, Max Pezzali, Gianni Morandi. He has also collaborated with international artists such as Whitney Houston, Manhattan Transfer, Lionel Richie y Gloria Gaynor.

Paolo began his public performance around the age of 10, for the fifth grade end of the year party and subsequently studied classical guitar for eight years. He is very open to all musical genres although his nature is mainly rock. In the period 1986–1987 he was a substitute guitarist for Banco del Mutuo Soccorso and was part of the official group that recorded the album Il Banco presents Francesco Di Giacomo in 1989 and also toured with them.

In 1987–1988 he collaborated on Adriano Celentano's album titled Il re degli ignoranti, later published in 1991, he participated in the Fantastico 8 television program that he hosted in that period and in his tour of Russia. His artistic career continued in 1989 when he began collaborating as a musician for several Italian song characters including Luca Barbarossa on the album Al di là del muro in 1989, Eros Ramazzotti and Max Pezzali. In 1989 he released his first album, Preguntas which contains 10 unpublished songs. In the texts we also find Bruno Lauzi. In 1990 he took part in Massimo Bizzarri's promotional tour. In 1992 he participated in the tour of Luca Barbarossa where Paolo was in charge of the arrangements, which also produced a live performance titled Vivo. From 1988 to 1996 he participated as a guitarist in some musical themes of the cartoons broadcast on the Mediaset networks. 

As a guitarist in 1989 he also collaborated with Pinuccio Pirazzoli on the soundtrack for the second season of the cult series Fininvest Don Tonino with Andrea Roncato, Gigi Sammarchi and Manuel De Peppe under the direction of Fosco Gasperi.

In 1995 he began his collaboration with Dhamm: he produced his first record on the Italian label EMI and, later, he played with them and conducted the orchestra in two different editions of the Sanremo Music Festival. Later he also embarks on a solo career, but later he decides that being a singer is not his true passion, but playing and producing. In 1997, after having passed the selections by winning the first night of Sanremo Giovani 1996, she qualified for the 1997 Sanremo Music Festival and participated in the New Proposals category with the song Non si mai dire... mai.

Simultaneously to his participation in Sanremo in February he released his second album entitled Paolo Carta which, in addition to containing Non si mai dire... mai. contains 10 unpublished songs   

In 2000 he returned to Gianni Morandi's side for the Come fa bene amore Tour, while since April 2001 he has been the guitarist on Eros Ramazzotti's Stilelibero Tour. From 2005 to date, he initiates his artistic partnership with Laura Pausini. Participating as a guitarist in her concerts and as a musical director. Since 2008 he has been involved in the production and arrangements of Laura Pausini's records and songs.

Discography

Studio album 
 1989 – Domande ( Teen Five Récords )
 1997 – Paolo Carta (5099748721822, Sony Music Entertainment )

Singles 
 1997 –  Non siamo normali ( EPC6642271, Sony Music Entertainment )
 1997 –  Un pensiero che impar si puó bailar ( Instrumental ) ( Sony Music Entertainment )

Productions 

 1994 – Dhamm - Dhamm
 1996 – Tra cielo y tierra - Dhamm
 1997 – Disorient express - Dhamm
 1997 – Paolo Carta ( Sony Music Entertainment )
 2009 – La fuerza - Marco Carta
 2010 – Il cuore muove - Marco Carta

Collaborations 

 with various artists
 1987 – La pubblica ottusita – Adriano Celentano
 1987 – Veneri – Mario Castelnuovo
 1988 – Sul nido del cuculo – Mario Castelnuovo
 1988 – Por paura o por amore – Mariella Nava
 1988 – Impar tutti gli uomini – Lucca Barbarossa
 1989 – Il giorno y la notte – Mariella Nava
 1989 – Punti di vista – Loretta Goggi
 1989 – Leali – Fausto Leali
 1989 – Al di lá del muro – Lucca Barbarossa
 1989 – Il Banco presenta Francesco Di Giacomo del Banco del Mutuo Soccorso
 1989 – Totò – Franco Simone
 1991 – Il re degli ignoranti – Adriano Celentano
 1992 – Lacrime – Mia Martini
 1992 – Mendicant y otro storie – Mariella Nava
 1992 – El incantautore – Mimmo Cavallo
 1993 – Lochness – Mina
 1993 – Ciao paese – Marco Carena
 1993 – Vive – Lucca Barbarossa
 1993 – Evento y mutamenti – Riccardo Cocciante
 1994 – Un uomo felice – Riccardo Cocciante
 1994 – Dhamm – Dhamm
 1994 – Scomporre y ricomporre – Fabio Concato
 1994 – Le cus da salvés – Lucca Barbarossa
 1994 – Canarino mannaro – Mina
 1998 – 30 Volte Morandi – Gianni Morandi
 1999 – Fabio Concato – Fabio Concato
 2000 – Stile Libero DVD - Eros Ramazzotti
 2004 – Gli occhi grandi della Luna – Alexia
 2009 – La forza mia – Marco Carta
 2010 – Il cuore muove – Marco Carta

 With Laura Pausini
 2006 – Io canto 
 2008 – Primavera in anticipo 
 2011 – Inedito 
 2013 – 20 – The Greatest Hits (Laura Pausini album) 
 2015 – Simili  
 2018 – Fatti sentire

Filmography 
 Laura Pausini – Laura Pausini: Piacere di conoscerti (Film: Music Documentary) – 2022

Awards

Latin Grammy Awards

References 

Italian guitarists
1964 births
Living people